Hossein Mozaffar is an Iranian conservative politician who was Minister of Education under President Mohammad Khatami and represented Tehran, Rey, Shemiranat and Eslamshahr in the Parliament of Iran twice. He is currently a member of the Expediency Discernment Council.

He is considered an ally of Mohammad Bagher Ghalibaf and close to Progress and Justice Population of Islamic Iran. Mozaffar was Ghalibaf's campaign manager in 2013 presidential election.

References

1952 births
Living people
Members of the 7th Islamic Consultative Assembly
Members of the 9th Islamic Consultative Assembly
Deputies of Tehran, Rey, Shemiranat and Eslamshahr
Alliance of Builders of Islamic Iran politicians
Society of Pathseekers of the Islamic Revolution politicians
Islamic Association of Teachers of Iran politicians
Progress and Justice Population of Islamic Iran politicians
Education ministers of Iran
Iranian campaign managers